MPO may stand for:

Astronomy 

 Mercury Planetary Orbiter, one component of the BepiColombo mission to Mercury
 Minor Planet Circulars Orbit Supplement, an astronomical publication from the Minor Planet Center
 Minor Planet Observer, an astronomical computer program partially based on the work of Mikko Kaasalainen

Science and technology 

 Myeloperoxidase, a peroxidase enzyme most abundantly present in neutrophil granulocytes
 .mpo file or Multi Picture Object, a 3D computer graphics image file format
 Medial preoptic area, a portion of the preoptic area of the hypothalamus
 Multi-fiber Push-On, a type of optical fiber connector
Multiset path ordering, a well-ordering in term rewriting (computer science)
Matrix Product Operator, a type of tensor network central to the Density Matrix Renormalisation Group numerical technique

Organizations 

 Macedonian Patriotic Organization, a United States and Canadian organization supporting Macedonians
 Metropolitan planning organization, a type of transportation policy-making organization in the United States
 Malaysian Philharmonic Orchestra, a Malaysian orchestra based in Kuala Lumpur
 Managerial and Professional Officers, former British trade union
 Management and Planning Organization of Iran, a now-dissolved organization previously responsible for Iran's budget

Other uses

 Metal Gear Solid: Portable Ops, a 2006 video game released for the PlayStation Portable
 Military Post Office, a key part of a military mail system
 Pocono Mountains Municipal Airport, by IATA code
 Most Productive Overs method in cricket
Metropolitan planning organization, a federally mandated and funded transportation policy-making organization in the United States
 Master of Prosthetics and Orthotics